Astone Lane was originally a right of way running between Brisbane Street and Baker Avenue in Perth, Western Australia. A proposal to name the right of way as Astone Lane was considered at the Town of Vincent council meeting in September 2006.  The naming of the lane was in honour of Antonino Astone, a migrant from Raccuia, Sicily, who established a bootmaker business nearby on the corner of Brisbane and William Streets. Astone was a well-known identity in the community, and a pioneer in assisting migrants who arrived in Fremantle after World War II, many of them settling into the area.

Antonino Astone
Antonino Astone was born in Raccuia, Sicily on 9 June 1907 and died on 25 December 1995; he arrived in Fremantle in 1949. Astone became a naturalised Australian citizen in a ceremony on 29 January 1964.

References

Streets in Perth, Western Australia